Antawn Cortez Jamison (born June 12, 1976) is an American former professional basketball player who played 16 seasons in the National Basketball Association (NBA). He serves as director of pro personnel for the Washington Wizards. Jamison played college basketball for the North Carolina Tar Heels, being named national player of the year in 1998. He was selected by the Toronto Raptors as the fourth overall pick of the 1998 NBA draft before being traded to the Golden State Warriors for former Tar Heel teammate Vince Carter.

Named to the NBA All-Rookie Team with the Warriors, Jamison was a two-time All-Star and won the NBA Sixth Man of the Year Award in 2004. He was a member of the United States national team in 2006. Upon his retirement from the NBA, he worked as an analyst for Time Warner Cable SportsNet and as a scout for the Los Angeles Lakers before being hired by the Washington Wizards as their director of pro personnel in 2019.

Early years
Jamison was born in Shreveport, Louisiana. His parents named him "Antwan", but the hospital misspelled it  "Antawn" on his birth certificate. The error was never corrected, but the pronunciation (as "Antoine") did not change. Jamison played basketball and football (as a quarterback) at Quail Hollow Middle School in Charlotte, North Carolina. He went on to play high school basketball at Charlotte's  Providence High School, where he was named a McDonald's All-American after his senior season, during which he averaged 27 points, 13 rebounds and 4.5 blocks per game.

College career
Jamison played three seasons of college basketball for the University of North Carolina at Chapel Hill, averaging 19.0 points and 9.9 rebounds per game. In his junior year, he was awarded both the Naismith and Wooden Awards as the most outstanding men's college basketball player for the 1997–98 season. Jamison decided to forgo his senior year of eligibility and enter the NBA draft in 1998.  He subsequently returned and earned a B.A. in Afro-American and African studies, graduating in August 1999.

On March 1, 2000, Jamison's #33 was retired at the Dean E. Smith Center, the seventh Tar Heel so honored.

Professional career

Golden State Warriors (1998–2003)
Jamison was selected with the fourth pick of the 1998 NBA draft by the Toronto Raptors, who then dealt his rights to the Golden State Warriors in exchange for former North Carolina teammate and best friend Vince Carter. Jamison spent the first five years of his NBA career with the Warriors. He scored a career-high 51 points on two occasions, back-to-back against Seattle and the Lakers (the Warriors won that game). He averaged a career-high 24.9 points per game in 2000–01, his third season in the league.

Dallas Mavericks (2003–2004) 
In 2003, Jamison was traded to the Dallas Mavericks in a nine-player deal that sent him, forwards Danny Fortson and Chris Mills, and guard Jiří Welsch to the Mavs and guard Nick Van Exel, center Evan Eschmeyer, guard Avery Johnson, and forwards Popeye Jones and Antoine Rigaudeau to the Warriors. With Dallas, Jamison experienced his first winning season in 2003–04 as the Mavericks finished 52–30 and made the playoffs, which also marked the first time in his career that Jamison had experienced post-season play. Jamison was named as the NBA's Sixth Man of the Year for his efforts. The Mavericks suffered a setback in the first round, falling in five games to the Sacramento Kings.

Washington Wizards (2004–2010)

At season's end Jamison was traded again, this time to the Wizards, in exchange for former Tar Heel Jerry Stackhouse, Christian Laettner, and a first-round draft pick (which turned out to be University of Wisconsin–Madison point guard, Devin Harris).

In the 2004–05 season with the Wizards, he was named to the NBA All-Star team for the first time in his career and the Wizards enjoyed a solid 45–37 win–loss season, their finest effort in 26 years. They also made the playoffs for the first time since 1997 and advanced to the second round for the first time since 1982.
In 2006, Jamison played for the US national team in the 2006 FIBA World Championship, winning a bronze medal.

Jamison led the Wizards against the Cleveland Cavaliers in the first round of the 2007 playoffs. Jamison averaged 32 points and 10 rebounds per game during the series.

During the 2007–08 season, Jamison was named to his second NBA Eastern All-Star team. On June 30, 2008, Jamison signed a four-year, $50 million contract with the Wizards.

Cleveland Cavaliers (2010–2012)

On February 17, 2010, Jamison was traded to the Cleveland Cavaliers as part of a three-team, six-player trade that sent Al Thornton from the Los Angeles Clippers to the Washington Wizards, Žydrūnas Ilgauskas, a 2010 first-round pick and the rights to Emir Preldžič from Cleveland to Washington, Drew Gooden from Washington to Los Angeles and Sebastian Telfair from Los Angeles to Cleveland. In his first game with the Cleveland Cavaliers against the Charlotte Bobcats, Jamison scored only two points from two free throws as he went 0 for 12 from the field. In his second game with the Cavaliers, Jamison scored 19 points against the Orlando Magic.
The Cleveland Cavaliers made the NBA playoffs as the team with the best record. The Cavaliers defeated Derrick Rose and the Chicago Bulls in five games, but fell to the Boston Celtics in 6 games. Weeks after the series, Jamison's teammate LeBron James left the Cavaliers, to join the Miami Heat alongside Dwyane Wade and Chris Bosh.

The Cavaliers had very little success in the 2010–11 NBA season, setting an NBA record 26-game losing streak (breaking a mark set by the franchise in 1983). That streak was finally snapped with a 126–119 overtime win against the Los Angeles Clippers. In January 2011, Jamison said that he was considering retirement, and that his 2011–12 season could be his last. On February 27, in a loss to the 76ers, Jamison was fouled and broke his left pinky. He underwent a surgery, and would be out the rest of the season. He finished his 14th NBA season in 2011–12 with averages of 17.2 points and 6.3 rebounds.

Los Angeles Lakers (2012–2013)

On July 25, 2012, Jamison signed with the Los Angeles Lakers for the NBA veteran's minimum. On November 30 against the Denver Nuggets, he scored a season-high 33 points and grabbed 12 rebounds, becoming the first Laker since Shaquille O'Neal in 1998 to record a 30/10 game as a reserve. However, coach Mike D'Antoni did not play him for multiple games, partially due to Jamison's inconsistent shooting and subpar defense. On January 4, 2013, he played against the Los Angeles Clippers for the first time after six games on the bench. On January 6, he entered in the first quarter against the Denver Nuggets and hit a jumper for his first points since December 13.  He played four minutes before being benched the rest of the game. Jamison again became a part of the Lakers' regular rotation after forward Pau Gasol was out with a foot injury. After the early communication issues with D'Antoni, their relationship improved significantly.

Los Angeles Clippers (2013–2014)
On August 28, 2013, Jamison signed with the Los Angeles Clippers. On December 11, 2013, in the second quarter against the Boston Celtics, Jamison scored a 3-pointer which took his career points tally past the 20,000 mark, becoming just the 39th player in NBA history to achieve this.

On February 20, 2014, Jamison was traded to the Atlanta Hawks in exchange for the draft rights to Cenk Akyol. He was waived by the Hawks the next day.

Retirement and legacy
Jamison retired from the NBA in 2014.

Of all former NBA players that are (or have been) eligible for election to the Naismith Memorial Basketball Hall of Fame, Jamison is one of only two players (along with Tom Chambers) to have scored 20,000 or more career points without being elected to the Hall.

Post-NBA career
In October 2014, Jamison retired from professional basketball and became a broadcaster for Time Warner Cable SportsNet as a TV analyst for the Los Angeles Lakers.

On October 3, 2017, Jamison was hired in a scouting role by the Los Angeles Lakers. In August 2019, he was hired by the Wizards to become their director of pro personnel.

Philanthropy
Jamison awarded his first Antawn C. Jamison Scholarship at his high school alma mater in 2003. Jamison has also launched a campaign which he calls "A Better Tomorrow" which he hopes to use to provide the underprivileged with a chance at a better future. He says of the project: "As a professional athlete, I have an obligation to help those less fortunate. I really enjoy being in a position to aid my community – both in the Bay Area and back home in Charlotte – and put a smile on somebody's face. That is what it is all about. I think it is especially important to give back during the holidays, when people tend to feel a little down if things are not going too well."

Career statistics

College

|-
| style="text-align:left;"| 1995–96
| style="text-align:left;"| North Carolina
| 32 || 29  || 32.9 || .624 || .000 || .596 || 9.7 || 1.0 || .8 || 1.0 || 15.1
|-
| style="text-align:left;"| 1996–97
| style="text-align:left;"| North Carolina
| 35 || * || 34.3 || .544 || .182 || .621 || 9.4 || 0.9 || 1.1 || .6 || 19.1
|-
| style="text-align:left;"| 1997–98
| style="text-align:left;"| North Carolina
| 37 || * || 33.2 || .579 || .400 ||.667 || 10.5 || 0.8 || 0.8 || 0.8 || 22.2
|- class="sortbottom"
| style="text-align:center;" colspan="2"| Career
| 104 || * || 33.5 || .577 || .296 || .617 || 9.9 || 0.9 || 0.9 || .8 || 19.0

Regular season

|-
| align="left" | 
| align="left" | Golden State
| 47 || 24 || 22.5 || .452 || .300 || .588 || 6.4 || .7 || .8 || .3 || 9.6
|-
| align="left" | 
| align="left" | Golden State
| 43 || 41 || 36.2 || .471 || .286 || .611 || 8.3 || 2.1 || .7 || .3 || 19.6
|-
| align="left" | 
| align="left" | Golden State
| 82 || 82 || 41.4 || .442 || .302 || .715 || 8.7 || 2.0 || 1.4 || .3 || 24.9
|-
| align="left" | 
| align="left" | Golden State
| 82 || 82 || 37.0 || .447 || .324 || .734 || 6.8 || 2.0 || .9 || .5 || 19.7
|-
| align="left" | 
| align="left" | Golden State
| 82 || 82 || 39.3 || .470 || .311 || .789 || 7.0 || 1.9 || .9 || .5 || 22.2
|-
| align="left" | 
| align="left" | Dallas
| 82 || 2 || 29.0 || .535 || .400 || .748 || 6.3 || .9 || 1.0 || .4 || 14.8
|-
| align="left" | 
| align="left" | Washington
| 68 || 68 || 38.3 || .437 || .341 || .760 || 7.6 || 2.3 || .8 || .2 || 19.6
|-
| align="left" | 
| align="left" | Washington
| 82 || 80 || 40.1 || .442 || .394 || .731 || 9.3 || 1.9 || 1.1 || .1 || 20.5
|-
| align="left" | 
| align="left" | Washington
| 70 || 70 || 38.0 || .450 || .364 || .736 || 8.0 || 1.9 || 1.1 || .5 || 19.8
|-
| align="left" | 
| align="left" | Washington
| 79 || 79 || 38.7 || .436 || .339 || .760 || 10.2 || 1.5 || 1.3 || .4 || 21.4
|-
| align="left" | 
| align="left" | Washington
| 81 || 81 || 38.2 || .468 || .351 || .754 || 8.9 || 1.9 || 1.2 || .3 || 22.2
|-
| align="left" | 
| align="left" | Washington
| 41 || 41 || 38.9 || .420 || .345 || .700 || 8.8 || 1.3 || 1.0 || .2 || 20.5
|-
| align="left" | 
| align="left" | Cleveland
| 25 || 23 || 32.4 || .485 || .342 || .506 || 7.7 || 1.3 || 1.1 || .5 || 15.8
|-
| align="left" | 
| align="left" | Cleveland
| 56 || 38 || 32.9 || .427 || .346 || .731 || 6.7 || 1.7 || .9 || .5 || 18.0
|-
| align="left" | 
| align="left" | Cleveland
| 65 || 65 || 33.1 || .403 || .341 || .683 || 6.3 || 2.0 || .8 || .7 || 17.2
|-
| align="left" | 
| align="left" | L.A. Lakers
| 76 || 6 || 21.5 || .464 || .361 || .691 || 4.8 || .7 || .4 || .3 || 9.4
|-
| align="left" | 
| align="left" | L.A. Clippers
| 22 || 0 || 11.3 || .315 || .195 || .720 || 2.5 || .4 || .3 || .1 || 3.8
|-
| align="center" colspan="2" | Career
| 1083 || 864 || 34.8 || .451 || .346 || .724 || 7.5 || 1.6 || 1.0 || .4 || 18.5
|-
| align="center" colspan="2" | All-Star
| 2 || 0 || 12.5 || .375 || .333 || .000 || 2.5 || .5 || .0 || .5 || 3.5
|}

Playoffs

|-
| align="left" | 2004
| align="left" | Dallas
| 5 || 0 || 21.8 || .456 || .250 || .733 || 5.0 || .4 || 1.0 || .4 || 13.0
|-
| align="left" | 2005
| align="left" | Washington
| 10 || 10 || 38.0 || .451 || .500 || .688 || 6.3 || 1.2 || .7 || .4 || 18.5
|-
| align="left" | 2006
| align="left" | Washington
| 6 || 6 || 42.2 || .424 || .313 || .778 || 7.2 || 3.0 || 1.0 || .3 || 19.2
|-
| align="left" | 2007
| align="left" | Washington
| 4 || 4 || 43.3 || .476 || .346 || .750 || 9.8 || 1.3 || .5 || 1.0 || 32.0
|-
| align="left" | 2008
| align="left" | Washington
| 6 || 6 || 39.5 || .406 || .280 || .571 || 12.0 || 1.0 || 1.3 || 1.3 || 16.8
|-
| align="left" | 2010
| align="left" | Cleveland
| 11 || 11 || 34.1 || .467 || .256 || .732 || 7.4 || 1.3 || .6 || 1.0 || 15.3
|-
| align="left" | 2013
| align="left" | L.A. Lakers
| 4 || 0 || 19.8 || .435 || .417 || .667 || 1.8 || .3 || .3 || .5 || 7.3
|-
| align="center" colspan="2" | Career
| 46 || 37 || 34.9 || .448 || .341 || .706 || 7.2 || 1.3 || .8 || .7 || 17.2

Career highs 
Points: 51 (2 times)
Rebounds: 23 vs. New York 01/30/10
Assists: 7 (7 times)
Steals: 6 (5 times)
Blocks: 5 vs. Miami 12/15/06

See also

List of National Basketball Association career scoring leaders

References

External links

Jamison's official website

NBA.com profile
FIBA interview

1976 births
Living people
2006 FIBA World Championship players
21st-century African-American sportspeople
African-American basketball players
All-American college men's basketball players
American men's basketball players
Basketball players from Shreveport, Louisiana
Basketball players from Charlotte, North Carolina
Cleveland Cavaliers players
Dallas Mavericks players
Golden State Warriors players
Los Angeles Lakers announcers
Los Angeles Lakers players
McDonald's High School All-Americans
National Basketball Association All-Stars
North Carolina Tar Heels men's basketball players
Power forwards (basketball)
Small forwards
Toronto Raptors draft picks
United States men's national basketball team players
Washington Wizards players
20th-century African-American sportspeople